Pacificreadium is a genus of trematodes in the family Opecoelidae. It consists of one species, Pacificreadium serrani (Nagaty & Abdel-Aal, 1962) Durio & Manter, 1968.

References

Opecoelidae
Plagiorchiida genera
Monotypic platyhelminthes genera